The 1971 WANFL season was the 87th season of the various incarnations of the Western Australian National Football League, and the forty-first (including three wartime under-age seasons) under that moniker.

Following half a decade dominated with the exception of two challenges from South Fremantle by the three Perth clubs and Austin Robertson's goalkicking, 1971 saw a changing of the guard, with Perth, in Mal Atwell’s last season as coach, dropping to second from bottom owing to the weakness of their forward line, and Subiaco also fell out of the four after an off-season disrupted by efforts to thwart potential clearances of goal machine Robertson, half-forward George Young, and promising young players Stephen Heal and Peter Featherby.

After a promising season in 1970 and the acquisition of Colin Tully from Collingwood, John Evans from St. Kilda and 30-possession-per-game rover Ross Parker from VFA club Prahran, Claremont became early favourites for the flag. The Tigers faltered later on however, and despite playing finals for only the fourth time since 1942 and the first since 1965, were regarded as disappointing. East Perth, despite a noticeable roving weakness owing to the injury-related retirement of Keith Doncon, won fifteen of seventeen matches but failed in the Grand Final before rivals West Perth, who after a disappointing 1970 returned to second position and sent champion ruckman “Polly” Farmer out on a high note with his sixth senior premiership and second as their captain-coach. More significantly, East Fremantle, after four disastrous seasons, reached the preliminary final under the coaching of future Hawthorn premiership mentor Alan Joyce and nearly overcame the Cardinals in a heart-stopping preliminary.

Although the season did not quite reach the previous season's record average score of 100.76 points per team per game, it did see a record-high losing score and the highest score and greatest winning margin for over a decade.

Home-and-away season

Round 1 (Easter weekend)

Round 2

Round 3

Round 4

Round 5

Round 6

Round 7

Round 8

Round 9 (Foundation Day)

Round 10

Round 11

Round 12

Round 13

Round 14

Round 15

Round 16

Round 17

Round 18

Round 19

Round 20

Round 21

Ladder

Finals

First semi-final

Second semi-final

Preliminary final

Grand Final

Notes
Had Perth won, the last-round match at Claremont Oval would have determined fourth position.George Doig (in 1934 to 1937, 1940 and 1941) and Bernie Naylor (in 1946 to 1948 and 1952 to 1954) previously held the record with six.

References

External links
Official WAFL website
Western Australian National Football League (WANFL), 1971

West Australian Football League seasons
WANFL